Hubert de Vaux may relate to:
Hubert I de Vaux, created Baron of Gilsland in 1157, by King Henry II of England. Died circa 1164.
Hubert II de Vaux, 5th Baron of Gilsland, whose daughter and heiress Maud passed the barony of Gilsland to the Multon family.